Priscilla's April Fool Joke is a 1911 American short silent comedy film directed by Frank Powell. It stars Florence Barker as Priscilla and features Blanche Sweet.

Cast
 Florence Barker as Priscilla
 Joseph Graybill as Harry
 Edward Dillon as Paul
 Stephanie Longfellow as Alice
 Vivian Prescott
 Dorothy West as Unidentified Role
 William Beaudine as On Lawn
 Blanche Sweet as On Lawn

See also
 Blanche Sweet filmography

References

External links

1911 films
American silent short films
Biograph Company films
American black-and-white films
1911 comedy films
Films directed by Frank Powell
1911 short films
Silent American comedy films
American comedy short films
Films with screenplays by Frank E. Woods
1910s American films